Agish is a Russian last name, a variant of Ageyev. It is also possible that it derived from the first name Agapy or Agafon.

People with the last name
Sagit Agish (1904–1973), Bashkir poet, writer, and playwright

References

Notes

Sources
И. М. Ганжина (I. M. Ganzhina). "Словарь современных русских фамилий" (Dictionary of Modern Russian Last Names). Москва, 2001. 

Russian-language surnames
